The Breeders' Cup Juvenile Fillies Turf is a one-mile turf stakes race for thoroughbred fillies two years old. As its name implies, it is part of the Breeders' Cup World Championships, the de facto year-end championship for North American thoroughbred racing.

The race was run for the first time in 2008 during the first day of Breeders' Cup racing at that year's host track, Santa Anita Park. Because of technical requirements, it was not eligible for classification as a graded stakes race in its first two runnings. The American Graded Stakes Committee made it a Grade II race in 2010. Effective with the 2012 edition, it became a Grade I race.

Automatic berths 
Beginning in 2007, the Breeders' Cup developed the Breeders' Cup Challenge, a series of races in each division that allotted automatic qualifying bids to winners of defined races. Each of the fourteen divisions has multiple qualifying races. Note though that one horse may win multiple challenge races, while other challenge winners will not be entered in the Breeders' Cup for a variety of reasons such as injury or travel considerations.

In the Juvenile Fillies Turf division, runners are limited to 14 and there are up to six automatic berths. The 2022 "Win and You're In" races were:
Moyglare Stud Stakes, a Group 1 race run in September at Curragh Racecourse in County Kildare, Ireland
Natalma Stakes, a Grade 1 race run in September at Woodbine Racetrack in Toronto, Ontario, Canada
Rockfel Stakes, a Group 2 race run in September at Newmarket Racecourse in Suffolk, England
 Miss Grillo Stakes, a Grade 2 race run in October at Aqueduct Racetrack in New York
 Prix Marcel Boussac, a Group 1 race run in October at Longchamp Racecourse in Paris, France
 Jessamine Stakes, a Grade 2 race run in October at Keeneland Racecourse in Kentucky

Records

Most wins by a jockey:
 2 – Javier Castellano (2016, 2017)
 2 – Irad Ortiz Jr. (2014, 2018)
 2 - Florent Geroux (2015, 2020)

Most wins by a trainer:
 5 – Chad C. Brown (2008, 2014, 2016, 2017, 2018)

Most wins by an owner:
 2 – e Five Racing Thoroughbreds (2016, 2017)
 2 – Bobby Flay (2010, 2021)

Winners

See also 

Breeders' Cup Juvenile Fillies Turf "top three finishers" and starters
 Breeders' Cup World Thoroughbred Championships
 American thoroughbred racing top attended events

References

Official Breeders' Cup website
Racing Post:

Horse races in the United States
Flat horse races for two-year-old fillies
Turf races in the United States
Juvenile Fillies Turf
Graded stakes races in the United States
Recurring sporting events established in 2008
2008 establishments in the United States